Glitch: The Rise & Fall of HQ Trivia is a 2023 American documentary film directed by Emmy Award-winning filmmaker Salima Koroma. It follows HQ Trivia, the trivia mobile game developed by Vine creators Rus Yusupov and Colin Kroll.

The film had its world premiere on CNN on March 5, 2023, and will be available to stream on HBO Max beginning April 6, 2023.

Synopsis
The film chronicles the rise and fall of HQ Trivia, the "game show on your phone" app.

People interviewed in the film include former HQ hosts Scott Rogowsky and Sharon Carpenter, along with technology journalists and experts such as Scott Galloway, Laurie Segall, and Taylor Lorenz.

Release
The film had its world premiere on CNN on March 5, 2023. Boosted by the film, CNN outpaced MSNBC and Fox News during primetime that evening, claiming the number one spot in the coveted 25-54 demo.

Reception 
Nate Adams of The Only Critic called the documentary "terrific" and "a must-see." In his review, Adams wrote, "Director Salima Koroma has assembled a nice parade of familiar faces within the tech sector to offer valuable logistics and understanding that paved the way for HQ’s massive blow-up and eventual death." Nick Schager, the Entertainment Critic for The Daily Beast called the documentary "entertaining." In his review, Schager wrote, "The cautionary tale is a familiar one. But it’s told with enough flashy verve and humor, along with a gossipy bombshell audio recording, to play as a breezy non-fiction look back at a phenom that had its 15 minutes—or, at least, enough time to get through an evening’s worth of quiz questions—in the smartphone spotlight."

Controversies 
On February 10, 2023, Alyssa Bereznak, the host of a 2020 podcast called Boom/Bust: The Rise and Fall of HQ Trivia, wrote a Twitter thread about similarities between her podcast and the trailer for Glitch: The Rise & Fall of HQ Trivia. She questioned the journalistic ethics of CNN, as two former HQ employees served as executive producers on the project. A subsequent report from Rolling Stone revealed that "several former HQ employees pitched the doc to CNN Films," and that "former HQ execs Dylan Abruscato and Brandon Teitel serve as executive producers." Abruscato led marketing and partnerships at HQ Trivia, and Teitel was a vice president at the company. In response to Bereznak's concerns, HQ Trivia co-founder Rus Yusupov explained why he did not participate in the CNN documentary: "Knowing who the producers were behind the CNN doc made me opt out due to potential conflicts/bias."

References

External links
 
 

2023 films
American documentary films
2023 documentary films
Biographical documentary films
CNN Films films
2020s English-language films
2020s American films
HBO Max original programming